Smārde Station is a railway station on the Torņakalns – Tukums II Railway.

References

External links

Railway stations in Latvia
Railway stations in the Russian Empire opened in 1877